Rebecca Macree (born 19 June 1971 in Barking, United Kingdom) is a former professional squash player from England. Macree was born deaf, but despite her disability was able to win 8 titles from 24 final appearances during a 17-year career on the WISPA tour from 1993 to 2005. She represented England in the World Team Squash Championships and European Team Championships. Her greatest achievement was being part of the England team that won the 2000 Women's World Team Squash Championships held in Sheffield.

She reached a career-high world ranking of World No. 7 in 2003. Her achievements place her among the world's most successful hearing-impaired athletes.

Macree began playing squash at the age of 14. Despite her relatively late start in the sport, she took to the game immediately and quickly began winning junior tournaments. She turned professional in 1993.

Throughout her career, Macree was known for being a very combative and forthright player, prone to occasional fits of temper on the court. In 2002, she received a 42-day ban from the Women's International Squash Players Association following a heated exchange with a referee at the Singapore Open which ended with Macree calling the official a "Tosser".

See also
 Official Women's Squash World Ranking

External links 
 
 Article at Squashmagazine.com (2003)
 SquashSite article on Macree's retirement (2005) 
 England Squash article on Macree's retirement (2005)

English female squash players
1971 births
Living people
Deaf sportspeople
People from Barking, London
English deaf people